Philippe Harel (born 22 December 1956) is a French film director, actor and screenwriter.

Selected filmography
The Story of a Boy Who Wanted to Be Kissed (1994)
 Une visite (1996) (Short)
 Les randonneurs (1997)
 La femme défendue (1997)
 Whatever (Extension du domaine de la lutte) (1999)
 A Hell of a Day (2001)
 Le Vélo de Ghislain Lambert (2001) 
 Tristan  (2003) 
 Tu vas rire mais je te quitte  (2005) 
 Les Randonneurs à Saint-Tropez (2008) 
 Les Heures souterraines (2015) 
 Un adultère  (2018)

External links

1956 births
Living people
French male screenwriters
French screenwriters
Film directors from Paris
French male film actors
French-language film directors
20th-century French male actors
21st-century French male actors